Ramanaidu or Rama Naidu is an Indian given name that may refer to the following notable people:
D. Ramanaidu (1936–2015), Indian film producer and founder of Suresh Productions
Edmund Santhara Kumar Ramanaidu, Malaysian politician, businessman, and entrepreneur
Nimmala Rama Naidu (born 1969), Indian politician